"Let's Go!" is a single by English new wave band Wang Chung, released on 6 January 1987 from their fourth studio album, Mosaic (1986). The single was a hit for the band in the United States, where it provided them with their second and last Top 10 hit on the Billboard Hot 100 in April 1987, peaking at No. 9. The single also formed the basis for its official music video. It also hit No. 9 on the Canada RPM Top 100 Singles chart. Jack Hues sings the verses of the song, and Nick Feldman sings the bridge. Both sing the chorus.

Reception
Cash Box called it an "effervescent, soulful pop workout."

Track listing

7": Geffen / 7-28531 (US)
 "Let's Go!" – 3:49
 "Betrayal" – 4:40

12": Geffen / GEF 17T (GER)
Side one
 "Let's Go!" (Shep's Mix)
 "Let's Dub"

Side two
 "Let's Go!" (Edit)
 "To Live and Die in L.A."

12" Maxi: Geffen / 0-20602 (USA)
Side one
 "Let's Go!" (Shep's Mix) – 8:00
 "Let's Dub" – 6:08

Side two
 "Let's Go!" (Edit) – 3:52
 "Betrayal (LP Version)" – 4:40

12" Maxi: Geffen / 92 06020 (CAN)
Side one
 "Let's Go!" (Shep's Mix) – 8:00
 "Let's Dub" – 6:08

Side two
 "Let's Go!" (Edit) – 3:52
 "The World in Which We Live (LP Version)" – 7:04

7" Geffen: / 928 531-7 (GER)
 "Let's Go!" – 4:05
 "The World in Which We Live" – 7:04

Charts

Weekly charts

Year-end charts

References

External links
 

1987 singles
Geffen Records singles
Wang Chung (band) songs
Songs written by Jack Hues
Songs written by Nick Feldman